Adem Karapici (born 1912) was an Albanian football player and coach who played for Sportklub Tiranë in the 1930s where he won six National Championships.

Managerial career
As a coach, he was in charge of Albania national team for five games between 1947 and 1948. He also coached Spartaku Tiranë, Puna Durrës, Luftëtari, Ylli i Kuq Pogradeci and Traktori Lushnjë.

Honours
Albanian Superliga: 6
 1930, 1931, 1932, 1934, 1936, 1937

References

1912 births
Year of death missing
Footballers from Tirana
Albanian footballers
Association football forwards
KF Tirana players
Albanian football managers
Albania national football team managers
KF Tirana managers
KF Teuta Durrës managers
Luftëtari Gjirokastër managers
KS Lushnja managers